The Western Kentucky Hilltoppers men's basketball team is the men's basketball team that represents Western Kentucky University (WKU) in Bowling Green, Kentucky. The Hilltoppers currently compete in Conference USA. The team's most recent appearance in the NCAA Division I men's basketball tournament was in 2013. Rick Stansbury was announced as the team's current head coach on March 28, 2016.

The men's basketball program has the 16th most victories in the history of the NCAA and has attained the eighth best winning percentage in NCAA history. The school made an NCAA Final Four appearance in 1971, which was later vacated, and has made four NIT Final Four appearances, including three in the early days of the NIT when it was on par with the NCAA tournament. The program has won numerous Ohio Valley Conference championships and was very competitive in its previous conference, the Sun Belt Conference, regularly finishing near the top of the conference and competing for the conference championship. In 2014, the Hilltoppers joined Conference USA following conference realignment.

Street & Smith's publication "100 Greatest Programs", ranked WKU #31. WKU has had 30 All Americans and 56 Hilltoppers have played professionally following their collegiate careers.

Conference affiliation history
 1914–15 to 1925–26 – Independent
 1926–27 to 1947–48 – Kentucky Intercollegiate Athletic Association & Southern Intercollegiate Athletic Association
 1948–49 to 1981–82 – Ohio Valley Conference
 1982–83 to 2013–14 – Sun Belt Conference
 2014–15 to present – Conference USA

Postseason
WKU has appeared in 40 national postseason tournaments and in five national final fours. The school currently has a policy of only accepting invitations to the NCAA or NIT tournaments, which precludes participation in other tournaments such as the CollegeInsider.com Postseason Tournament  and College Basketball Invitational.

NCAA tournament results
The Hilltoppers have appeared in the NCAA tournament 23 times. Their combined record is 19–24. Their appearance in the 1971 NCAA Tournament and third place finish were later vacated by the NCAA due to a player, Jim McDaniels, having signed a professional contract and accepted money during the season.

* Vacated by the NCAA

NIT results
The Hilltoppers have appeared in the National Invitation Tournament (NIT) 15 times.  When the NIT started, it was considered the premiere national college basketball tournament and remained on par with the NCAA Tournament through the mid 1950s, until the NCAA began giving automatic bids to conference champions in 1956. Western Kentucky's first eight appearances occurred during this early period, including their 2nd place finish in 1942, 3rd place in 1948, and 4th place in 1954. WKU also made the NIT Final Four in 2018. Their combined record is 13–16.

Other tournament results
In 1936 Western Kentucky was invited to the National Olympic Playoffs representing the South. They played two games against the Southwest representative, Arkansas, in Little Rock, AK, losing both games by scores of 36–43 and 30–38.

The Hilltoppers were scheduled to appear in the 1938 National Intercollegiate Basketball tournament; however, the team was unable to make the trip and withdrew from the tournament.  The NAIA lists the game as a forfeit, but Western Kentucky does not recognize the contest as part of their official record.

The Hilltoppers appeared in the 1951 National Campus Basketball Tournament where they were defeated by Bradley 71–75 in the first round.

Milestones

E.A. Diddle Arena
The E.A. Diddle Arena is a 7,326-seat multi-purpose arena in Bowling Green, Kentucky, United States. The arena, built in 1963 is named after legendary WKU men's coach and Basketball Hall of Famer Edgar "E.A." Diddle.

Current coaching staff
 Steve Lutz - Head Coach
 Nakita Johnson - Assistant Coach
 Talvis Franklin - Director of Basketball Operations
 Bob Hubbard - Academic Coordinator 
 Martin Cross - Associate Director of Basketball Operations
 Erien Watson - Program Manager

All-Americans

Retired jerseys
The first jerseys retired in honor of Hilltopper basketball greats were hung in E.A. Diddle Arena during the 1999–2000 season. Also even though the jerseys are retired current and future players can and do use the numbers of the players whose jerseys are retired.

Season-by-season results

See also
List of teams with the most victories in NCAA Division I men's college basketball

References

External links
 

 
Basketball teams established in 1914
1914 establishments in Kentucky